Yiddah is a locality in New South Wales, Australia. Yiddah is in the Bland Shire local government area and Bland county cadastral area.

Yiddah railway station (Opened - 02 Dec 1903, Closed - 04 May 1975)) is on the Lake Cargelligo railway line. There is a grain silo and siding there.

References

External links

Towns in the Central West (New South Wales)